John Kaye (23 October 1955–2 May 2016) was an Australian politician. He was elected to the New South Wales Legislative Council at the 2007 state election and represented the Greens. He was a vocal critic of electricity industry privatisation and a strong advocate for renewable energy and energy efficiency. He believed in life-long, high quality, and free public education and was a determined spokesperson for public schools as well as Colleges of Technical and Further Education (TAFE).

Early career

After gaining a Bachelor of Engineering and a Masters in Engineering Science at the University of Melbourne, Kaye worked as an engineer for the State Electricity Commission of Victoria.

Kaye earned a PhD from the University of California, Berkeley. He was then a postdoctoral fellow at the Australian National University, and later an academic in electrical engineering at the University of New South Wales where he specialised in sustainable energy and greenhouse issues.

Political career

After leaving the Labor Party in the late 1980s, Kaye worked for independent community candidates and developed a passion for "sensible urban planning, genuine community consultation and participatory democracy" and he joined the Greens Party in 1997.

From 1998 to 2001, Kaye was the Greens policy coordinator and, from 1999 to 2002, was policy advisor to Greens MLC Lee Rhiannon, leading campaigns for public education; sustainable transport; the urban, rural, and natural environments; workers' rights; and developer donations to political parties. In the 2003 state election, he acted as the Greens campaign coordinator and policy coordinator.

In the 2004 federal election Kaye was the Greens lead candidate for the Australian Senate from New South Wales. As lead candidate, the Greens vote increased to 7.3% but, due to less-favourable preference flows, he failed to gain a seat by a margin of 0.5%.

At the 2007 state election he was elected as the second candidate on a Greens ticket headed by Lee Rhiannon.

Kaye's portfolio responsibilities included Premier & Cabinet, Treasury, Finance, Education and Training, Energy, Health Services, Science & Medical Research, Water Utilities, Fair Trading, Gaming and Racing, Infrastructure, and Commerce.

Death
In February 2016, Kaye was diagnosed with an aggressive form of cancer. He had been undergoing treatment, but died on 2 May 2016, aged 60. He was survived by his partner Lynne, his sister Dina, and brothers Andrew and Stephen. Kaye is buried at Waverley Cemetery.

References

External links 
John Kaye's homepage

1955 births
2016 deaths
Australian Greens members of the Parliament of New South Wales
Members of the New South Wales Legislative Council
Academic staff of the University of New South Wales
University of Melbourne alumni
University of California, Berkeley alumni
Deaths from cancer in New South Wales
21st-century Australian politicians